The  men's tournament  of the 2014 Asian Games Basketball Competition was held from 20 September to 3 October 2014 in Incheon, South Korea. China was the defending Gold medal winners of the competition in 2010, which they won in their home soil. South Korea emulated that feat by winning the Gold Medal in Incheon in 2014. Iran and Japan completed the podium by winning the Silver and Bronze medals, respectively. Games of the tournament were held at the 7,406 seat Samsan World Gymnasium, and the 5,158 seat Hwaseong Sports Complex.

Squads

Results
All times are Korea Standard Time (UTC+09:00)

Qualifying round

Group A

Group B

Preliminary round

Group C

Group D

Group E

Group F

Quarterfinal round

Group G

Group H

Classification (5–8)

Semifinals

Classification 7th–8th

Classification 5th–6th

Final round

Semifinals

Bronze medal game

Gold medal game

Final standing

References

Men's tournament